(Austrum Latvijas Linukss) is a bootable live CD Linux distribution based on Slackware. It was created & is actively maintained by a group from the Latgale region of Latvia. The entire operating system and all the applications run from RAM, making Austrumi faster than larger distributions that must read from a disk, and allowing the boot medium to be removed after the operating system has booted.

See also

 Comparison of Linux Live Distros
 Lightweight Linux distribution
 List of Linux distributions that run from RAM

References

External links

 Mirrorserver http://austrumi.ru.lv/

Slackware
Linux distributions without systemd
Linux distributions